De La Place may refer to:

Surnames 
 Pierre de la Place (c. 1520-1572), French Protestant magistrate, writer and philosopher;
 Josué de la Place (v. 1596- ..), French Protestant theologian;
 Frédérick Deschamps de La Place (17th century), French governor of Île de la Tortue;
 Pierre-Antoine de La Place (1707-1793), French writer and dramatist;
 Jean Baptiste Meusnier de la Place (1754-1793), surveyor, French general engineer.

Names 
 Rivière de la Place, a tributary of the Métabetchouane River, in the Laurentides Wildlife Reserve, in the Capitale-Nationale, in Quebec, in Canada.